The 2002–03 Grand Prix of Figure Skating Final was an elite figure skating competition held from February 28 to March 2, 2003 in Saint Petersburg, Russia. Medals were awarded in men's singles, ladies' singles, pair skating, and ice dancing. Unlike most competitions that season, the compulsory dance was not part of the ice dancing competition at the Grand Prix Final.

The Grand Prix Final was the culminating event of the ISU Grand Prix of Figure Skating series, which at the time consisted of Skate America, Skate Canada International, Bofrost Cup on Ice, Trophée Lalique, Cup of Russia, and NHK Trophy competitions. The top six skaters from each discipline competed in the final.

In the 2002–03 season, competitors at the Grand Prix Final performed a short program, followed by two free skating or free dance programs. This was implemented because of television coverage. Ottavio Cinquanta envisioned that the skaters would perform two new free skating programs for the season at the final and this would appeal to and help attract viewers. Instead, most skaters went back to an old free skating program for one of the free skatings. Due to the failure of this plan, the second free skating/dance was eventually removed from the Grand Prix Final.

Results

Men

Ladies

Pairs

Ice dancing

External links
 2002–03 Grand Prix of Figure Skating Final

2003 in figure skating
2003 in Russian sport
Grand Prix of Figure Skating Final
Grand Prix of Figure Skating Final
International figure skating competitions hosted by Russia
Sports competitions in Saint Petersburg
Grand Prix of Figure Skating
Grand Prix of Figure Skating